Champion's tree mouse (Pogonomys championi) is a species of rodent in the family Muridae.
It is found only in Papua New Guinea.

References

Pogonomys
Rodents of Papua New Guinea
Mammals described in 1988
Taxonomy articles created by Polbot
Taxa named by Tim Flannery